Przewalski's wonder gecko (Teratoscincus przewalskii) is a species of lizard in the family Sphaerodactylidae. The species is endemic to East Asia.

Etymology
The specific name, przewalskii, is in honor of Russian explorer and naturalist Nikolai Mikhailovitch Prjevalsky.

Geographic range
T. przewalskii is found in China and Mongolia.

Habitat

Reproduction
T. przewalskii is oviparous.

References

Further reading
Rösler H (1995). Geckos der Welt – alle Gattungen. Leipzig: Urania Verlag. 256 pp. (Teratoscincus przewalskii, p. 92). (in German).
Strauch A (1887). "Bemerkungen über die Geckoniden-Sammlung im zoologischen Museum der kaiserlichen Akademie der Wissenschaften zu St. Petersburg ". Mémoires de l'Académie Impériale des Sciences de St.-Pétersbourg, VIIe Série [= Seventh Series] 35 (2): 1-72. (Teratoscincus przewalskii, new species, pp. 71–72). (in German).
Zhao E, Adler K (1993). Herpetology of China. Oxford, Ohio: Society for the Study of Amphibians and Reptiles (SSAR). 522 pp. . (Teratoscincus przewalskii, pp. 185, 304).

Teratoscincus
Reptiles described in 1887